The Oxford Book of Contemporary Verse, edited by D. J. Enright, is a poetry anthology from 1980, published by Oxford University Press. It might be considered one of the "last words" from a founder-member of The Movement, with its comments in the Introduction still in an anti-romantic vein, and that "the editor remains unpersuaded that wit is necessarily evasive in some shabby way or emotionally lowering". It was reissued in 1995 under the title Oxford Book of Verse 1945–1980.

Poets in the Oxford Book of Contemporary Verse

Dannie Abse
Kingsley Amis
James K. Baxter
Patricia Beer
John Berryman
Earle Birney
Elizabeth Bishop
George Mackay Brown
Charles Causley
Robert Conquest
Donald Davie
Douglas Dunn
D. J. Enright
Gavin Ewart
Roy Fuller
Thom Gunn
Seamus Heaney
John Heath-Stubbs
Anthony Hecht
Geoffrey Hill
A. D. Hope
Ted Hughes
Randall Jarrell
Philip Larkin
Robert Lowell
Norman MacCaig
Derek Mahon
Howard Nemerov
Peter Porter
A. K. Ramanujan
Peter Redgrove
Vernon Scannell
Louis Simpson
C. H. Sisson
Stevie Smith
Jon Stallworthy
R. S. Thomas
Charles Tomlinson
Derek Walcott
Richard Wilbur

External links
 "D.J. Enright is soon to bring out his ‘Oxford Book of Contemporary Verse 1945-1980’. Here is the substance of his introductory statement", London Review of Books, Vol. 2, No. 9, 15 May 1980, pp. 14–16

1980 poetry books
British poetry anthologies
Contemporary Verse, Oxford Book of